Muir Seamount is a seamount (underwater volcano), located at . It is located in the Bermuda rise, a seismically active region, and was the site of an earthquake on 24 March 1978.

These samples were used to analyse the weight percentage of carbonate over time on the ocean floor, which in turn would provide clues to the oceanic environment over time. This was interpreted as indicating an increase in flow from the colder waters of the Antarctic, and the stagnation of the North American flows. A total of 8 core samples have been gathered, with ages ranging from Pliocene to Late Cretaceous. No radiometric dates are available for the seamount, but it may of Early Cretaceous time.

Over 150 invertebrates have been collected in total from Bear, Manning, and Muir seamounts. Ophiuroids and goose barnacles are the most abundant animal found on the seamount, as is Asteroshchema sp., a basket star. Paragorgia have also been observed. Genetic tests on the specimens collected indicated that Muir Seamount is the most genetically isolated of the four.

References

Seamounts of the Atlantic Ocean